Monkey Hill is a railway station on the Bhor Ghat in Maharashtra, India. It serves as technical halt at which trains stop to check brakes. Almost all trains traveling from Khandala to Palasdari stop at Monkey Hill. Formerly, a reversing station was located between Monkey Hill and Khandala. The remains of the reversing station can be seen near the Amrutanjan Bridge on the old Mumbai–Pune road (Mumbai–Chennai National Highway NH48).

Some of the trains halting at Monkey Hill are:
 11008 Deccan Express
 11010 Sinhagad Express
 11020 Konark Express
 11024 Sahyadri Express (Formal Poona Mail)
 11030 Koyna Express
 11302 Udyan Express
 17412 Mahalaxmi Express
 12124 Deccan Queen
 12126 Pragati Express
 12128 Mumbai–Pune Intercity Express
 12702 Hussainsagar Express
 17032 Hyderabad Mumbai Express
 16382 Kanyakumari–Mumbai Express
 22106 Indrayani Express

Catch siding
The station also has an inclined track in case of train brake failure. This is called a catch siding. It was used if a train had problem with its brakes or was out of control, as the inclined track slowed the train. Today this is very rarely used.

References

 Monkey Hill (India Rail Info)

External links
 irfca.org Bhore Ghat gallery photos of Monkey Hill

Railway stations in Raigad district
Lonavala-Khandala